Otto III, Prince of Anhalt-Bernburg (died 27 February 1404) was a German prince of the House of Ascania and ruler of the principality of Anhalt-Bernburg.

He was the youngest son of Bernhard III, Prince of Anhalt-Bernburg, by his third wife Matilda, daughter of Magnus I, Duke of Brunswick-Göttingen.

Life
Bypassed in his rights of inheritance during the life of his older half-brothers Bernhard IV and Henry IV, he only took possession of the principality of Anhalt-Bernburg when Henry died in 1374. Alongside his princely title, he also assumed the style "Lord of Bernburg".

On his death, Otto was succeeded by his nephew Bernhard V, son of the late Henry IV, and by his youngest son Otto IV, who ruled jointly with Bernhard.

Marriages and Issue
By his unknown first wife, Otto had two sons:
Bernhard VI, Prince of Anhalt-Bernburg (d. 2 February 1468)
Otto IV, Prince of Anhalt-Bernburg (d. 1 May 1415).

Before 1391 Otto married for a second time to Lutrudis (d. aft. 2 July 1426), daughter of Gebhard IV, Count of Mansfeld-Querfurt. They had one daughter:
Matilda (d. Coswig, bef. 1432), married aft. 1413 to George I, Prince of Anhalt-Dessau.

Princes of Anhalt-Bernburg
1404 deaths
Year of birth unknown